The Iglesia Ni Cristo Locale of Washington, is a chapel of the Philippine-based Christian sect, the Iglesia ni Cristo. Located at Sampaloc, Manila, it was completed on 1948, and it is the first chapel built in reinforced concrete by the church.

Brief history 
By the late 1940s, The Church Administration decided to build a permanent house of worship for the young and growing Local Congregation of Washington. This locale was already established in the early 40s out of parts of the Tayuman Congregation, under which an extension was established to serve the brethren in northeastern Manila. Brother Felix Y. Manalo tasked architect Alfredo J. Luz to build a concrete house of worship along Washington street (now A. Maceda street) in Sampaloc, Manila. It was dedicated by Brother Manalo in 1948, the first of many to be built in the coming years.

In 2010, the 62-year-old chapel underwent renovation to meet the standard of the Iglesia ni Cristo Construction and Engineering Department. The chapel was upgraded into an fully air-conditioned chapel and made some alterations in the interior and partially on exterior of the chapel. The chapel is now part of the ecclesiastical district of Maynila, and it gave birth to offshoot locales like La Loma Congregation, Sampaloc Congregation, and Galas Congregation (It Became Araneta Avenue Congregation, however Galas locale was Re-established as a separate Locale from Araneta).

References

External links

Chapels in the Philippines
Houses of worship of the Iglesia ni Cristo
Churches completed in 1948
1948 establishments in the Philippines
20th-century religious buildings and structures in the Philippines